Kim Hyung-ju (born 14 March 1976 in South Korea) is a male South Korean judoka who competed in the half-lightweight category. His wife, Lee Eun-hee, is also a judoka.

External links
 
 
 Profile at Korea Judo Association 

1976 births
Living people
Asian Games medalists in judo
Judoka at the 2002 Asian Games
South Korean male judoka
Asian Games gold medalists for South Korea
Medalists at the 2002 Asian Games
21st-century South Korean people